The Saratoga Victory Mill on Gunter Avenue in Guntersville, Alabama was built in 1928 when the company moved from Victory, Saratoga County, New York.  It was a work of architectural and engineering firm Robert & Company.  It has also been known as Guntersville Mill and as Standard-Coosa-Thatcher Mill.  It was listed on the National Register of Historic Places in 1984.

See also 
 Victory Mills in Saratoga County, New York

References

National Register of Historic Places in Marshall County, Alabama
Industrial buildings completed in 1928
Buildings and structures in Marshall County, Alabama
Industrial buildings and structures on the National Register of Historic Places in Alabama
Cotton mills in the United States
1928 establishments in Alabama